The National Administrative Department of Statistics, commonly referred to as DANE, is the Colombian Administrative Department responsible for the planning, compilation, analysis and dissemination of the official statistics of Colombia. DANE is responsible for conducting the National Population and Housing census every ten years, among several other studies.

See also
 Administrative Department of Security

References

Colombia
Demographics of Colombia
National Administrative Department of Statistics
Government agencies established in 1953
1953 establishments in Colombia